The 1914 Clemson Tigers football team represented Clemson Agricultural College—now known as Clemson University—as a member of the Southern Intercollegiate Athletic Association (SIAA) during the 1914 college football season. Under fourth-year head coach Bob Williams, the team compiled an overall record of 5–3–1 with a mark of 2–2 in SIAA play. William Schilletter was the team captain.

Schedule

References

Clemson
Clemson Tigers football seasons
Clemson Tigers football